Monica Cresswell Maughan (née Wood, 15 September 1933 – 8 January 2010) was an Australian actor with roles in theatre, radio, television, film and ballet over a career spanning 52 years.

Early life and education
She was born Monica Cresswell Wood in Tonga to Australian missionaries Rev. Dr A. Harold Wood and medical doctor Olive Wood (née O'Reilly). She had 5 brothers and sisters, including Dr Elizabeth Wood-Ellem and Rev. Dr H. D'Arcy Wood. The family moved to Sydney, Australia, in 1937 – Monica was three-and-a-half and spoke no English – and shortly afterwards to Melbourne, where her father became principal of Methodist Ladies' College (MLC) and her mother his unofficial deputy.

Monica attended MLC, where she received her only formal drama training with speech teacher Dorothy Dwyer, and went on to study French at the University of Melbourne, graduating in 1959 with a BA. 

Monica was a member of the Melbourne University Dramatic Club, where she adopted the stage name Maughan. She made her stage debut opposite Barry Humphries in Ben Hecht's fast-paced satire The Front Page in April 1954.

While studying part-time, she worked as a secretary at St Ives Hospital in Melbourne. In 1960, she returned to MLC to teach speech.

Acting career

Theatre
Monica Maughan launched her professional career with the Union Theatre Repertory Company (UTRC) in 1957 playing Capulat in Jean Anouilh's romantic comedy Ring Round the Moon at Union Theatre, Parkville. Her first lead role came that same year in Beauty and the Beast.

The UTRC, Australia's first professional theatre company, became the Melbourne Theatre Company (MTC) in 1968. Maughan appeared in more plays for that flagship company than any other actor.  She also directed 2 plays for the MTC. Her last MTC performance was in the premiere production of David Williamson's Scarlett O'Hara at the Crimson Parrot in 2008.

Cast in J.C. Williamson productions in the early 1960s, Maughan spent 1963–66 working in the UK, where she appeared in various West End productions – including stepping in for Moira Lister when the latter was sick.

Maughan appeared in at least 7 plays in her first year back in Australia, most of them lead roles, and throughout the late sixties was hailed for her stage performances, such at the title role in The Prime of Miss Jean Brodie (1968), directed by MTC founder, John Sumner (theatre director) (1924-2013). In 1971, she won the Melbourne Theatre Award for Best Actress for her portrayal of pregnant spinster Anna Bowers in Donald Howarth's Three Months Gone. Coincidentally, Maughan was three months pregnant at the end of the play's run.

She worked with almost every major theatre company in Australia, including Chekhov's The Cherry Orchard and Alan Bennett's Habeas Corpus for the Queensland Theatre Company in 1978, and the role of Aggie in A Hard God produced by the State Theatre Company of South Australia and Tennessee Williams' Cat on a Hot Tin Roof by Sydney Theatre Company, both in 1981.

Her best-known stage role may have been as Miss Prism in the MTC's The Importance of Being Earnest. The production, co-starring Frank Thring, Ruth Cracknell and Geoffrey Rush, was so popular that it toured Australia between 1988 and 1992, and was televised by the ABC.

In 1999, she created the role of Suzanne Beckett in Justin Fleming's Burnt Piano at Belvoir Company B, and demonstrated a command of classical piano played live in each performance. In 2003, she starred in Inheritance by Hannie Rayson. 

She did not live to play the title role in Belvoir Company B's Gwen in Purgatory in 2010, a part written for her by Tommy Murphy and directed by Neil Armfield.

Television and radio
Early television roles in Crawford's dramas led to ongoing television parts that made Maughan a recognisable face around Australia, including prim secretary Jean Ford in the first year of The Box (1974–75) and downtrodden prisoner Pat O'Connell for five months in women's-prison drama Prisoner in 1979–80.

Maughan worked extensively in ABC TV and radio over nearly 50 years, receiving an AFI Award and a Silver Logie Award for her performance as Monica McHugh in the ABC's black comedy mini-series, The Damnation of Harvey McHugh (1994).

Ballet
Monica Maughan extended her repertoire to include non-dancing roles with the Australian Ballet, namely Doreen's mother in The Sentimental Bloke (2002) and Effie's mother in La Sylphide (2005).

Film
Her 20 or so feature films include A City's Child (1971), Road to Nhill (1997), Crackerjack (2002) and Strange Bedfellows (2004), plus a number of films by Dutch-Australian director Paul Cox. Her last film role was in Blessed, directed by Ana Kokkinos in 2009, and described by 3RRR film critic Brian MacFarlane as Maughan's best ever.

Awards
Erik Kuttner Award for Acting (1968) for the title role in The Prime of Miss Jean Brodie (MTC)
Erik Kuttner Award for Best Actress (1971) as Anna Bowers in Three Months Gone (MTC)
AFI Award (Hoyts Prize) for Best Performance (1971) for the lead role in A City’s Child (dir. Brian Kavanagh)
Green Room Award for Best Supporting Actress (1983) as Mollie in Gulls (MTC)
Television Society of Australia Commendation for performance by an Actress in a supporting role in a mini-series (1985) for her role in Flying Doctors (Crawford's)
Green Room Award for Best Supporting Actress (1987) as Mme Arcati in Blithe Spirit (MTC)
Green Room Award for Best Supporting Actress (1990) as Miss Prism in The Importance of Being Earnest (MTC)
Silver Logie Award Most Outstanding Actress (1995) as Monica McHugh in The Damnation of Harvey McHugh (ABC)
AFI Award for Best Actress in a TV Drama (1995) as Monica McHugh in The Damnation of Harvey McHugh (ABC)
Green Room Award for Best Actress (1998) for her role in Tear from a Glass Eye (Playbox)
Critics' Choice Award for Best Supporting Actress (2008) as the teacher Mrs Walkham in The Toy Symphony (Belvoir St Company B)

Age
Maughan was always coy about her age and many sources gave her year of birth as 1938. When celebrating 50 years of professional acting in 2007, Maughan said she was "20 or 21" in 1954 and admitted she "always lied about my age".

Personal life
Maughan's first marriage was to Brian Essex, then a medical student, in December 1954, with her father officiating at the wedding, they divorced in 1957.

Her second marriage, in January 1968, was to Melbourne solicitor Rowland Ball; the couple had three daughters.

Death
Maughan died of complications from cancer at the Peter MacCallum Cancer Centre in Melbourne on 8 January 2010.

Filmography

FILM

TELEVISION

References

External links
 
 Monica Maughan – Stage acting credits
 "The Importance of Being Earnest" – (information and photos):

1933 births
2010 deaths
Actresses from Melbourne
Australian film actresses
Australian radio actresses
Australian soap opera actresses
Australian stage actresses
Best Actress AACTA Award winners
Deaths from cancer in Victoria (Australia)
Logie Award winners
University of Melbourne alumni
University of Melbourne women
20th-century Australian actresses
21st-century Australian actresses